James G. Kiernan (18 June 1852 - 1 July 1923) was an American psychologist, prominent in American gay history for the first recorded use of the terms "heterosexual" and "homosexual" in 1892. Jonathan Ned Katz, historian of the American gay and lesbian experience, cites Kiernan's initial attribution of perversion to the term "heterosexual." Kiernan went on to write of a variety of topics, e.g. Mary MacLane's disciple Viola Larsen, who stole a horse and wrote romantic letters to other girls, as an example of child precocity and possible genius.

References

External links 
 http://www.outhistory.org/wiki/Kiernan:_%22Heterosexual,%22_%22Homosexual,%22_May_1892

1852 births
American psychologists
Year of death missing